Producers Produce Company Plant is a historic manufacturing complex located at Springfield, Greene County, Missouri. The original sections were built about 1920, and expanded through 1980. The complex consists of nine two- and three-story red brick buildings that housed a wholesale poultry packing and egg factory.  They include the Poultry Storage building, Office and Packing Plant, Egg Preparation Department, Egg Drying Building, Packing Plant, two Cold Storage Buildings, Engine Room, and Freight Station.

It was listed on the National Register of Historic Places in 2010.

References

Industrial buildings and structures on the National Register of Historic Places in Missouri
Industrial buildings completed in 1920
Buildings and structures in Springfield, Missouri
National Register of Historic Places in Greene County, Missouri
Poultry companies
1920 establishments in Missouri